Robert Lyon may refer to:
 Robert Menli Lyon (1789–1874), early settler in Western Australia
 Robert Lyon (politician) (1832?–1888), Canadian politician in Ontario
 Robert Adam Lyon (1829–1901), Canadian businessman and politician
 Robert Lyon (duellist) (1812–1833), last Canadian killed in a duel
 Robert Lyon (journalist) (1810–1858), English-American journalist and newspaper editor and publisher
 Robert W. Lyon (1842–1904), American politician, mayor of Pittsburgh, Pennsylvania
 Robert Lyon (British Army officer) (1923–2019), British general
 Bob Lyon (born 1955), American politician from Kansas

See also
Robert Lyons (disambiguation)